John William Carrington was the 9th Civil Auditor General. He was appointed on 1 December 1817, succeeding E. Tolfrey, and held the office until 1823. He was succeeded by Henry Augustus Marshall.

References

Auditors General of Sri Lanka
British colonial governors and administrators in Asia
Year of birth missing
Year of death missing